The National Theatre is a historic former theatre in Launceston, Tasmania, Australia.

History
Located on the corner of Charles Street and Paterson Street, the National Theatre was formally opened on 25 September 1915 by Mayor Alderman Percy Hart, whose wife Margaret raised the curtain for a production of The Silence of Dean Maitland staged by the George Marlow Dramatic Company. The National was used for theatre productions, films, ballet, opera, and sporting events such as boxing and wrestling. Early theatrical performances and amusements included Harry Lauder, Roy Rene and Annette Kellerman.
Classical music and operatic productions included Eileen Joyce, Ignaz Friedman, Essie Ackland, Rudolf Pekárek, John Brownlee, Peter Dawson and brothers Jascha Spivakovsky and Tossy Spivakovsky.

In 1934, the National was remodelled to address safety and accessibility issues, which saw the stage dropped to ground level, the stalls lowered and the Charles Street entrance stairs removed. The auditorium was updated with Australian-made Raycophone sound technology, and the National reopened as a talkie with The Head of the Family and Fashions of 1934.

Broadway theatre and Hollywood actor Mona Barrie appeared in theatrical performances at the National in the 1940s whilst contracted to J. C. Williamson's.
Throughout the 1940s several ballet companies and personalities visited the theatre including the Borovansky Ballet, Bodenwieser Ballet and acclaimed Russian ballerina Tamara Tchinarova.

Purchase by the Launceston City Council
Following the Second World War, the theatre fell into financial hardship and after several years of closure was purchased by the Launceston City Council (LCC) for £A17,000.
Although the LCC proposed the theatre be renamed the Margaret McIntyre Memorial Theatre after Margaret McIntyre, the first female elected to the Parliament of Tasmania, this never eventuated.
The theatre continued to be used to host international theatrical performances, live music, amusements, as well as amateur theatre productions. In 1951, the stage was damaged in a fire caused by experimentation with flash powder, causing over £A6,000 worth of damage.
Following the refurbishment of Hobart's Theatre Royal in 1954, Minister for Health Reg Turnbull requested the LCC approach Premier Robert Cosgrove for a grant to restore the National Theatre.
In 1958, South African actor Morry Barling suddenly died onstage. The theatre remained active throughout the 1960s, largely hosting performances by the Tasmanian Ballet Company.

Closure
Due to ongoing costs, the LCC decided to sell the theatre in 1969, although events continued into the next year. The Australian Elizabethan Theatre Trust premiered Ermanno Wolf-Ferrari's comedic opera School for Fathers, Welsh dramatist Emlyn Williams performed his one-man show on the life of Charles Dickens and world-renowned pianist Winifred Atwell gave the final performance at the theatre on 14 November 1970. The building was sold to the printing company Foot & Playsted.

Contemporary use
The National Theatre has been greatly preserved by Foot & Playsted, who use the auditorium for storage.

Since MONA FOMA festivities expanded to include Launceston in 2018, the National Theatre has been used for arts events by Quandamooka artist Megan Cope and visual artist Thomas Demand. In 2022 the National Theatre was featured in programming by Open House Launceston.

See also
List of entertainers who died during a performance
List of national theatres
List of theatres in Hobart

References

1915 establishments in Australia
Cinemas in Launceston
City of Launceston
Former theatres in Tasmania
History of Tasmania
Theatres completed in 1915
Former cinemas